Frederick Herbert (March 4, 1887 – May 29, 1963) was a pitcher in Major League Baseball who made two starts for the 1915 New York Giants.

References

External links

1887 births
1963 deaths
Major League Baseball pitchers
New York Giants (NL) players
Baseball players from Illinois
Sportspeople from La Grange, Illinois
Ottawa Senators (baseball) players
Scranton Miners players
Toronto Maple Leafs (International League) players